Matthew Harper (June 27, 1974) served as the 59th Mayor of Huntington Beach, California (2013-2014). Harper was elected to three terms to the Huntington Beach Union High School District Board of Trustees (1998-2010), one term to the Huntington Beach City Council (2010-2014) and two terms to the California State Assembly (2014-2018).

Early life 
Harper was born in Long Beach, California and lived briefly in Colorado, but grew up in Westminster and Huntington Beach.  He is a graduate of Huntington Beach High School.

Education 
Harper attended Orange Coast College in 
Costa Mesa, California. Harper earned a Bachelor of Science degree in Public Policy and Management from  USC in Los Angeles, California.

Career 
Harper was first elected to the Huntington Beach Union High School District (HBUHSD) in 1998, re-elected with the most votes in 2002, and named to an uncontested third term in 2006. There are five governing board members, or trustees, that are each elected at-large by HBUHSD voters. The HBUHSD serves the secondary education needs of the Orange County communities of Huntington Beach, most of Westminster, most of Fountain Valley, a portion of Garden Grove and all of unincorporated Midway City. Four separate feeder elementary school districts serve the primary education needs of the territory served by the HBUHSD. High schools in the district include: Huntington Beach High School, Westminster High School, Marina High School, Fountain Valley High School, Edison High School, Ocean View High School, Valley Vista High School, Coast High School, Community Day School, and Huntington Beach Adult School.

After completing his third term on the HBUHSD Board of Trustees, on November 2, 2010, Harper was elected to become a member of city council for Huntington Beach, California. Harper's campaign platform included public safety, infrastructure, economic development, administrative and fiscal accountability, property rights, personal freedom and opposition to higher taxes. In 2012, Harper was chosen by the mayors of the Second District to the Orange County Transportation Authority (OCTA) Board of Directors.

In 2013, Harper became the 59th Mayor of Huntington Beach, California, until 2014.

As Mayor, Harper worked to complete the Vans Skate Park, broke ground on a new senior center, and sought to repeal several laws, including the 1987 ban on state-approved fireworks. In his four years on the Huntington Beach City Council, Harper "built a reputation as conservative, pro-business and unafraid."

Matthew Harper subsequently served as member of the California State Assembly for District 74, encompassing the coastal Orange County communities of Huntington Beach, Costa Mesa, Newport Beach, Irvine, Laguna Woods, and Laguna Beach for two terms.

From 2007–2011, Harper served as a policy advisor and deputy chief of staff to then-Orange County Supervisor Janet Nguyen. In 2011, Harper served as an appointee to the five-member Orange County Redistricting Committee.

For two years, Harper was the elected Chairman for the Young Republican Federation of California (YRFC) and served on their state board for over ten years. Locally, Harper has been elected to several terms to the Orange County Republican Party Central Committee. Harper has served on the executive committee for the OCGOP. Statewide, Harper served as the elected Associate Representative to the California Republican Party. As Associate Representative, Harper was an ex-officio member of the state platform committee. In 2014, he was elected to the California State Assembly, defeating Newport Beach Mayor Keith Curry, a fellow Republican. He served two terms and was defeated in the 2018 General election by Democrat Cottie Petrie-Norris.

Matthew Harper continues as a delegate to the California Republican Party.

In 2020, Harper was a candidate for Huntington Beach city council and lost, placing 7th out of 15 candidates.

In 2022, Harper was a candidate for the California Board of Equalization and lost, placing 4th out of 7 candidates.

Election history

2014 California State Assembly

2016 California State Assembly

2018 California State Assembly

Personal life 
In 2014, Harper married Elizabeth Byrne. Harper and his family live in Huntington Beach, California.

References 

Republican Party members of the California State Assembly
Living people
Mayors of Huntington Beach, California
USC Sol Price School of Public Policy alumni
21st-century American politicians
1974 births